Amerijuanican is the fourth full-length album by stoner metal band Bongzilla. It was released in September 2005 by Relapse Records. The album title is a portmanteau of the words "American" and "marijuana". It is the band's only album to feature "Dixie" Dave Collins on bass. The song "Champagne & Reefer" is a cover of blues musician Muddy Waters.

Track listing
All songs written by Bongzilla, except where noted.

Production
Produced by Bongzilla & Wendy Schneider
Recorded, engineered & mixed by Wendy Schneider
Mastered by Daniel Stout

Personnel
Mike "Muleboy" Makela: Guitars, vocals
Jeff "Spanky" Schultz: Guitars
"Dixie" Dave Collins: Bass
Mike "Magma" Henry: Drums, percussion

References

External links
Production credits for Amerijuanican

Bongzilla albums
Relapse Records albums
2005 albums